Sharon Kwan (born October 12, 1995 in Columbus, Ohio) is a Chinese American Mandopop singer.  In June 2011, Sharon participated in the first season of Taiwan's China Television (CTV)'s (中視) star search show, Chinese Million Star 1 (華人星光大道), which was the Taiwanese equivalence of American Idol and won the overall champion on January 8, 2012. She released her first album on August 24, 2012, titled Home Girl, and became the first female student of Taiwanese Golden Melody Award-winning singer-songwriter David Tao. In 2015 Sharon took part in the fourth season of the Chinese talent show The Voice of China. She ended up being placed in the top four in team Jay Chou.

Music Journey

Early Development
Sharon was born in Columbus, Ohio to parents of Cantonese origin, and currently stays in Taiwan. Her interest in pursuing Chinese culture and music led her to move to China in 2002 to study, and attended elementary school in the Shanghai Conservatory of Music. She specialized in Erhu because of her love for the Twelve Girls Band who played traditional Chinese instruments. She moved back to America in 2008.

At the age of 14, she became interested in Mandopop and Kpop, and began to record covers of Mandarin and Korean songs. As her videos began to attract many views, she began to take vocal lessons with Singer-Songwriter/Producer C.J. Emmons
in Los Angeles, and in her two years of training she performed in restaurants and began to participate in major reality-singing competitions. In April 2010 she took part in the fifth season of Super Idol 5 and moved on to the top 25; In September 2010 she took part in the eighth season of ETTV Top Idol and was one of the final 10 contestants.

Rise to fame
On May 14, 2011, Sharon took part in the audition for Taiwanese reality-singing show Chinese Million Star that was held in Los Angeles, and was invited to Taiwan to take part in the competition. She then moved to Taiwan in June 2011 with her mother and sister, and successfully passed many rounds of the competition. She was the youngest contestant of the top 6, but was able to continually make personal breakthroughs in her performances, and obtained high affirmations from influential singers and songwriters like Liu Chia-chang and Lo Ta-yu. Her popularity rose quickly, and in a short time her competition videos attracted more than 10 million views on the web. Finally, her talents and charisma on stage made her the cream of the crop, and on January 8, 2012 won the overall champion of the first season of the competition. At the age of 16, she was the youngest champion of the Million Star competitions.

One of the judges of the contest, David Tao, a well-known figure in the Mandopop industry, saw her potential as a superstar, and immediately signed her under his company Great Entertainment. She officially became his first female student.

In March and April 2012, Sharon returned to Los Angeles to take her exams, and received invitations from Jason Chen and Gerald Ko, who were famous singers on the internet. They performed covers of various famous hits, and the songs attracted more than 2 million views in half a year. Her vocal skills received widespread acclaim.

Debut and Career(2012– )
Sharon was signed to Gin Star Entertainment in 2012, and became an artiste under Gin Star Entertainment, Great Entertainment and Seed Music. Preparations for her debut album immediately began, and on August 24, 2012, just 7 months after her competition, she released her first album titled "Home Girl".

"Home Girl" was produced personally by David Tao. He believed that electronic K-pop music or lyrical mandarin songs were not the most suitable for Sharon's age and style. Hence he searched for a special team of Golden Melody Award-winning producers and songwriters, and produced an album that created her own music style.

In 2015, she auditioned in the 4th season of "The Voice of China" with the Song 晴天, originally sung by Jay Chou. She passed the blind audition with a two chair turn and was on Team Jay. Sharon was selected in Team Jay's final four but was later eliminated by Team Na Ying's Gary Sun.

Discography

Albums

Singles

Concerts
Her first concert, 'Home Party" was held on November 2, 2012 at Riverside Live House in Taipei. Besides performing songs from her album, she also did covers of classic songs by Teresa Teng, Faye Wong and many more.

Live Performances
2011
December 31, 2011 Countdown concert held in Yes Plaza in Rowland Heights, CA.
2012
April 28, 2012 [E-DA Super Asia Music Festival] Sharon participated in this festival held in E-DA World in Kaohsiung, together with other superstars from Taiwan, Japan and Korea.
November 11, 2012 [Exit Music Festival] Held in Luzhou Station in Luzhou, New Taipei, Taiwan.
November 24, 2012 Christmas Event held in Gongguan, Taipei.
December 30, 2012 Year end concert held in Keelung.
December 31, 2012 Hsinchu County countdown concert.
2013
February 14, 2013 [2013 New Taipei City Pingxi Sky Lantern Festival].
April 18, 2013 [17th Channel V Chinese Music Awards]
May 18, 2013 [David Tao The Glamorous Life World Tour- Shanghai] Performance guest.
June 1, 2013 [David Tao The Glamorous Life World Tour- Nanjing] Performance guest.
June 29, 2013 [David Tao The Glamorous Life World Tour- Chengdu] Performance guest.
July 20, 2013 [David Tao The Glamorous Life World Tour- Macau] Performance guest.
August 10, 2013 [Daphne Extreme Live Concert].
September 7, 2013 [David Tao The Glamorous Life World Tour- Beijing] Performance guest.
October 1, 2013 [David Tao The Glamorous Life World Tour- Shenzhen] Performance guest
October 25, 2013 [48th Golden Bell Awards]
November 2, 2013 [David Tao The Glamorous Life World Tour- Nanning] Performance guest.
November 15, 2013 [David Tao The Glamorous Life World Tour- Fuzhou] Performance guest.
January 18, 2014 [David Tao The Glamorous Life World Tour- Genting Highlands, Malaysia] Performance guest.

Filmography

Short films
2012
June 2012 Samsung Galaxy SIII (preview)
July 2013 Samsung Galaxy SIII (series of 6 clips)

TV Drama

Awards
2012
December 2012 [20th Chinese Music Chart] Nominated for Most Popular New Artiste, Best New Artiste awards.
2013
January 2013 [Top Star Awards] Nominated for Taiwan and Hong Kong Most Popular New Artiste.
March 2013 [2013 HITO Music Awards] Nominated for Most Popular New Artiste.

References

1995 births
Living people
American women pop singers
The Voice of China contestants
21st-century American women singers
21st-century American singers